Jay Johnson (born July 11, 1949) is an American ventriloquist and actor, best known for playing Chuck (and Bob) Campbell on Soap.

Early life

Johnson was  born in Lubbock, Texas, and raised in Richardson, Texas.

Television
In addition  to his role on Soap, Johnson has also appeared as a celebrity guest on many game shows and hosted two series of his own, So You Think You Got Troubles (1983) and Celebrity Charades (1979).
 
He performed in an episode of Mrs. Columbo, playing a ventriloquist who finds his dummy is acting independently of his will and kills the man who carved it. Other post-Soap TV credits include appearances on The Love Boat, Gimme a Break!, Simon & Simon, The Facts of Life, Empty Nest (reuniting him with his father from Soap, Richard Mulligan), and Dave's World. 

He starred in Broken Badges (1990), a Stephen Cannell CBS television production in which he played Stanley Jones, a depressed police officer who was also a ventriloquist. 

In 1999, he reprised his role of Chuck (and Bob) Campbell in an episode of That '70s Show. Post-2000 appearances include the 2001 TV Movie What's Up, Peter Fuddy?, an appearance on Reno 911!, and the role of Christopher Davis—biological father of "The Miniature Killer" Natalie Davis—in the CSI: episode "Living Doll".

Live theater
Jay Johnson: The Two & Only! written and performed by Jay Johnson, opened on Broadway to rave reviews at the Helen Hayes Theatre on September 28, 2006. This was preceded by an acclaimed off-Broadway run at the Atlantic Theatre Company in New York. The show also performed at the Zero Arrow Theatre, Cambridge, Massachusetts, and the Brentwood and Colony Theater Company in Los Angeles, California. The Cambridge performance garnered the New England Critics Award, and in Los Angeles, Johnson received the 2006 Ovation Award for Best Solo Performance.

The show deconstructs and demonstrates Johnson's lifelong obsession with the art of ventriloquism. The show is a Valentine, not only to the art, but also to his mentor and friend Arthur Sieving, who created Johnson's first professional puppet. The show is aided and abetted by a cast of ventriloquated characters, including his Soap alter ego, Bob. Johnson won the 2007 Tony Award for Best Special Theatrical Event for the show. He is the only ventriloquist to ever be nominated and win an American Theatre Wing Tony Award or an Ovation Award.

The show was filmed on September 15, 2012, in Thalian Hall in Wilmington, North Carolina. Johnson enlisted film and stage director Bryan W. Simon to direct the film adaptation of the performance. Johnson first met Simon in 2009 when he starred in the comedy documentary I'm No Dummy, directed by Bryan W. Simon.

The original Bob puppet featured on Soap was inducted into the Smithsonian Institute's collections of pop culture icons in May 2007. He currently uses a replica Bob for Jay Johnson: The Two & Only! and other appearances.

References

External links
 Jay Johnson: The Two & Only! - Official Broadway website
 Jay Johnson's official site

 IBDB
 Playbill article: Jay Johnson: 'The Two & Only!' Plays Burbank Prior to Broadway 
Extended audio interview with Jay Johnson about Soap
 BroadwayWorld.com interview with Jay Johnson, June 6, 2007

1949 births
Living people
Ventriloquists
American male television actors
People from Lubbock, Texas
Male actors from Texas